Eritettix is a genus of slant-faced grasshoppers in the family Acrididae. There are at least four described species in Eritettix.

Species
These four species belong to the genus Eritettix:
 Eritettix abortivus Bruner, 1890 (Texas short-winged slant-face grasshopper)
 Eritettix carinatus (Scudder, 1902)
 Eritettix obscurus (Scudder, 1878) (obscure grasshopper)
 Eritettix simplex (Scudder, 1869) (velvet-striped grasshopper) - type species (as Eritettix variabilis Bruner)

References

Further reading

 
 
 

Acrididae genera
Articles created by Qbugbot
Gomphocerinae